Baikunthpur is a town and a nagar panchayat in Rewa district in the state of Madhya Pradesh, India. It is about 25 kilometers from Rewa.

Demographics
 India census, Baikunthpur had a population of 9,301. Males constitute 52% of the population and females 48%. Baikunthpur has an average literacy rate of 59%, lower than the national average of 59.5%; with 61% of the males and 39% of females literate. 18% of the population is under 6 years of age.

References

Cities and towns in Rewa district